Aitor Rodríguez Fernández is a Grand Prix motorcycle racer from Spain.

Career statistics

By season

Races by year

References

External links
 Profile on motogp.com

1984 births
Living people
Spanish motorcycle racers
250cc World Championship riders